Merkt is a surname. Notable people with the surname include:

Irmgard Merkt (born 1946), German music educator
John L. Merkt (1946–2009), American politician
Rick Merkt (born 1949), American politician, attorney, and businessman

See also
Mert (given name)